Yeşim Bostan (born 24 May 1995) is a Turkish compound archer. She is native of Muğla, Turkey, where she studied physical education at Sıtkı Koçman University. She is a member of İstanbul Büyükşehir Belediyespor.

Career
Representing Turkey, she debuted internationally in 2014, and on the bronze medal in the team event at the 2014 European Championships in Echmiadzin, Armenia. She competed in three events at the 2015 World Championships in Copenhagen, Denmark. At the 2018 World Indoor Championships in Yankton, South Dakota, USA, she took the silver medal in the Individual event. At the second leg of the 2018 World Cup in Antalya, she became gold medalist in Individual event.

In 2022, she won the bronze medal in the women's team compound event at the European Indoor Archery Championships held in Laško, Slovenia. She also won the bronze medal in the mixed team compound event. She won the silver medal in the women's team compound event at the Antalya, Turkey event in the 2022 Archery World Cup.

References

1995 births
Living people
People from Muğla
Turkish female archers
Universiade medalists in archery
Universiade silver medalists for Turkey
Universiade bronze medalists for Turkey
Archers at the 2019 European Games
European Games medalists in archery
European Games bronze medalists for Turkey
Medalists at the 2017 Summer Universiade
Medalists at the 2019 Summer Universiade
21st-century Turkish sportswomen
Islamic Solidarity Games medalists in archery